Wafaa Ismail Baghdadi (born 1 October 1969) is an Egyptian athlete specializing in the shot put. In November 2007 she was found guilty of taking prohibited substance Methandienone and disqualified for 2 years.

Achievements

Doping
In November 2007 she was found guilty of taking prohibited substance Methandienone and disqualified for 2 years.

See also
 Egyptian athletes
 List of champions of Africa of athletics
 List of doping cases in athletics

References

External links
IAAF profile

Living people
Egyptian female shot putters
1969 births
Doping cases in athletics
Egyptian sportspeople in doping cases
African Games bronze medalists for Egypt
African Games medalists in athletics (track and field)
Athletes (track and field) at the 1999 All-Africa Games
Athletes (track and field) at the 2003 All-Africa Games
Athletes (track and field) at the 2007 All-Africa Games